Cyperus chionocephalus is a species of sedge that is native to parts of Somalia.

See also 
 List of Cyperus species

References 

chionocephalus
Plants described in 1951
Flora of Somalia
Taxa named by Emilio Chiovenda